Mohamed El-Guindi (1920 – 13 November 1995) was an Egyptian footballer. He competed in the men's tournament at the 1948 Summer Olympics.

References

External links
 
 

1920 births
1995 deaths
Egyptian footballers
Egypt international footballers
Olympic footballers of Egypt
Footballers at the 1948 Summer Olympics
People from Khartoum
Association football forwards
Al Ahly SC players
Egyptian football managers
Egypt national football team managers